The Revolutionary movement for Indian Independence was part of the Indian independence movement comprising the actions of violent underground revolutionary factions. Groups believing in armed revolution against the ruling British fall into this category, as opposed to the generally peaceful civil disobedience movement spearheaded by Mahatma Gandhi. 

The revolutionary groups were mainly concentrated in Bengal, Bombay, Bihar, the United Provinces and Punjab. More groups were scattered across India.

Beginnings
Apart from a few stray incidents, the armed rebellion against the British rulers was not organised before the beginning of the 20th century. The revolutionary philosophies and movement made their presence felt during 1905 partition of Bengal. Arguably, the initial steps to organise the revolutionaries were taken by Aurobindo Ghosh, his brother Barin Ghosh, Bhupendranath Datta, Lal Bal Pal and Subodh Chandra Mullick, when they formed the Jugantar party in April 1906. Jugantar was created as an inner circle of the Anushilan Samiti, which was already present in Bengal, mainly as a fitness club.

Andaman Island

Communist Consolidation

Communist Consolidation was an organization formed in Cellular Jail and was founded by Hare Krishna Konar with other 39 intimate in the jail this organization was formed after the freedom fighters started studying about Communism, Socialism and Marxism and in 1937 the political prisoners and the members of the Communist Consolidation of Cellular Jail started feeling that the atmosphere for a World War II and they though before the war starts they should get back to mainland country to be with their people and take an active part in the upheaval that was imminent, so the prisoners started hunger strike against the British government and this hunger strike was led by the founder of Communist Consolidation Hare Krishna Konar, some notable strikers were Batukeshwar Dutt (associated with Bhagat Singh), Sachindra Nath Sanyal(founder of Hindustan Socialist Republican Association), Ganesh Ghosh(member of Chittagong armoury raid) and many others.

Andhra Pradesh 
Uyyalawada Narasimha Reddy (died 22 February 1847) was the son of a former Indian Telugu polygar who was at the heart of a rebellion in 1846, when 5000 peasants rose up against the British East India Company (EIC) in Kurnool district, Rayalaseema Region of Andhra Pradesh. They were protesting changes to the traditional agrarian system the British introduced in the first half of the nineteenth century to the traditional agrarian system. Those changes, which included the introduction of the ryotwari system and other attempts to maximize revenue, impacted lower-status cultivators by depleting their crops and leaving them impoverished.

Bengal

Anushilan Samiti

Established by Pramathanath Mitra, it became one of the most organised revolutionary associations, especially in eastern Bengal, where the Dhaka Anushilan Samiti had several branches and carried out major activities. Jugantar was initially formed by an inner circle of the Kolkata Anushilan Samiti, like the Palmach of Haganah. In the 1920s, the Kolkata faction supported Gandhi in the Non-Cooperation Movement and many of the leaders held high posts in Congress. The Anushilan Samati had over five hundred branches. Indians living in America and Canada had established the Gadar Party.

Jugantar

Barin Ghosh was the main leader. Along with 21 revolutionaries including Bagha Jatin, he started to collect arms and explosives and manufactured bombs. The headquarters of Jugantar was located at 93/a Bowbazar Street, Kolkata.

Some senior members of the group were sent abroad for political and military training. One of them, Hemchandra Kanungo, obtained his training in Paris. After returning to Kolkata he set up a combined religious school and bomb factory at a garden house in the Maniktala suburb of Calcutta. However, the attempted murder of district Judge Kingsford of Muzaffarpur by Khudiram Bose and Prafulla Chaki on 30 April 1908 initiated a police investigation that led to the arrest of many of the revolutionaries.

Bagha Jatin was one of the top leaders in Jugantar. He was arrested, along with several other leaders, in connection with the Howrah-Sibpur Conspiracy case. They were tried for treason, the charge being that they had incited various regiments of the army against the ruler.

Jugantar, along with other revolutionary groups, aided by Indians abroad, planned an armed revolt against the British rulers during the First World War. This plan largely depended on the clandestine landing of German arms and ammunitions in the Indian coast. This plan came to be known as the Indo-German Plot.  However, the planned revolt did not materialise.

After the First World War Jugantar supported Gandhi in the Non-Cooperation Movement and many of their leaders were in the Congress. Still, the group continued its revolutionary activities, a notable event being the Chittagong armoury raid.

Benoy Basu, Badal Gupta and Dinesh Gupta, who are noted for launching an attack on the Secretariat Building – the Writers' Building in the Dalhousie Square in Kolkata, were Jugantar members.

Uttar Pradesh

Hindustan Socialist Republican Association

The Hindustan Republican Association (HRA) was established in October 1924 in Kanpur, Uttar Pradesh by revolutionaries like Ramprasad Bismil, Jogesh Chatterjee, Chandrashekhar Azad, Yogendra Shukla and Sachindranath Sanyal. The aim of the party was to organise armed revolution to end the colonial rule and establish a Federal Republic of the United States of India. The Kakori train robbery was a notable act of this group. The Kakori case led to the hanging of Ashfaqullah Khan, Ramprasad Bismil, Roshan Singh, Rajendra Lahiri. The Kakori case was a major setback for the group. However, the group was soon reorganised under the leadership of Chandrashekhar Azad and with members like Bhagat Singh, Bhagwati Charan Vohra and Sukhdev on 8 and 9 September 1928– and the group was now christened Hindustan Socialist Republican Association (HSRA).

In Lahore on 17 December 1928, Bhagat Singh, Azad and Rajguru assassinated Saunders, a police official involved in deadly lathi-charge on Lala Lajpat Rai. Bhagat Singh and Batukeshwar Dutt threw a bomb inside the Central Legislative Assembly. The Assembly Bomb Case trial followed. Bhagat Singh, Sukhdev Thapar and Shivaram Rajguru were hanged on 23 March 1931.

Maharashtra

Abhinav Bharat Secret Society 
The Abhinav Bharat Society (Young India Society) was a secret society founded by Vinayak Damodar Savarkar and his brother Ganesh Damodar Savarkar
in 1904. Initially founded at Nasik as "Mitra Mela" when Vinayak Savarkar was still a student of Fergusson College at Pune, the society grew to include several hundred revolutionaries and political activists with branches in various parts of India, extending to London after Savarkar went to study law. It carried out a few assassinations of British officials, after which the Savarkar brothers were convicted and imprisoned. The society was formally disbanded in 1952.

Savarkar's revolutionary propaganda led to the assassination of Lt. Col. William Curzon-Wyllie, the political aide-de-camp to the Secretary of State for India, by Madanlal Dhingra on the evening of 1 July 1909, at a meeting of Indian students in the Imperial Institute in London. Dhingra was arrested and later tried and executed. A. M. T. Jackson, the district magistrate of Nasik, was assassinated in India by Anant Laxman Kanhare in 1909 in the historic "Nasik Conspiracy Case".

The investigation into the Jackson assassination revealed the existence of the Abhinav Bharat Society and the role of the Savarkar brothers in leading it. Vinayak Savarkar was found to have dispatched twenty Browning pistols to India, one of which was used in the Jackson assassination. He was charged in the Jackson murder and sentenced to "transportation" for life. Savarkar was imprisoned in the Cellular Jail in the Andaman Islands in 1910.

Kotwal Dasta
Veer Bhai Kotwal alias Veer Bhai Kotwal during Quit India Movement formed group of underground mercenaries called "Kotwal Dasta", a parallel government in the Karjat taluka of Thane district. They were about 50 in numbers including farmers and voluntary school teachers. They decided to cut down the electric pylons supplying electricity to Mumbai city. From September 1942 through November 1942 they felled 11 pylons, paralyzing the industries and railways.

South India

The uprising against the British was evidenced at Halagali (Mudhol taluk of Bagalkot district). The prince of Mudhol, Ghorpade, had accepted British overlordship. But the Bedas (hunters), a martial community, were seething with dissatisfaction under the new dispensation. The British proclaimed the Disarming Act of 1857 whereby men possessing firearms had to register them and secure a license before 10 November 1857. Babaji Nimbalkar, a soldier thrown out of job from Satara Court, had advised these people not to lose their hereditary right to own arms.

One of the leaders of the Bedas, Jadgia, was invited by the administrator at Mudhol and was persuaded to secure a license on 11 November, though Jadgia had not asked for it. The administrator's expectation that others would follow Jadgia was belied. So he sent his agents to Halagali on 15 and 20 November and again on 21. But the entreaties of the agents did not succeed, and the agents sent on 21 November were attacked by Jadgia and Baalya, another leader, and they were forced to return. Another agent sent on 25 November was not allowed to enter the village.

Meanwhile, the Bedas and other armed men from the neighbouring villages of Mantur, Boodni, and Alagundi assembled at Halagali. The administrator reported the matter to Major Malcolm, the Commander at the nearby army headquarters, who sent Col. Seton Karr to Halagali on 29 November.

The insurgents, numbering 500, did not allow the British to enter Halagali. There was a fight during the night. On 30 November, Major Malcolm came with 29th Regiment from Bagalkot. They set fire to the village and many insurgents died, including Babaji Nimbalkar. The British, who had a bigger army and better arms, arrested 290 insurgents; and of those 29 were tried and 11 were hanged at Mudhol on 11 December, and six others, including Jadagia and Baalya, were hanged at Halagali on 14 December 1857. No prince or jagirdar was involved in this uprising, but it was the common soldiers.

Violent revolutionary activities never took firm root in South India. The only violent act attributed to the revolutionaries was the assassination of the Collector of Tirunelveli (Tinnevelly). On 17 June 1911, the Collector of Tirunelveli, Robert Ashe, was killed by Vanchinathan, who subsequently committed suicide, which was the only instance of political assassination by a revolutionary in South India.

Outside India

India House

The India House was an informal Indian nationalist organization that existed in London between 1905 and 1910. Initially begun by Shyamji Krishna Varma as a residence in Highgate, North London, for Indian students to promote nationalist views and work, the house became a centre for intellectual political activities, and rapidly developed into a meeting ground for radical nationalists among Indian students in Britain at the time, and of the most prominent centers for revolutionary Indian nationalism outside India. The Indian Sociologist, published by the house, was a noted platform for anti-colonial work and was banned in India as "seditious literature".

The India House was the beginning of a number of noted Indian revolutionaries and nationalists, most famously V. D. Savarkar, as well as others of the like of V.N. Chatterjee, Lala Har Dayal, V. V. S. Iyer, The house came to the attention of Scotland Yard's work against Indian seditionists, as well as the focus of work for the nascent Indian Political Intelligence Office. India House ceased to be a potent organisation after its liquidation in the wake of the assassination of William Hutt Curzon Wyllie by an India House member named Madan Lal Dhingra. This event marked the beginnings of the London Police's crackdown on the activities of the house and a number of its activists and patrons, including Shyamji Krishna Varma and Bhikaiji Cama moved to Europe to carry on works in support of Indian nationalism. Some Indian students, including Har Dayal, moved to the United States. The network that the House founded was key in the nationalist revolutionary conspiracy in India during World War I.

Gadar Party 

Gadar party was a predominantly Sikh organization that started operating abroad in 1913 "with the view to do-away with the British rule in India". The party collaborated with revolutionaries inside India and helped them get arms and ammunition. Lala Hardayal was a prominent leader of the party and promoter of the Gadar newspaper. The Komagata Maru incident in 1914 inspired several thousand Indians residing in the USA to sell their businesses and rush home to participate in the anti-British activities in India. The party had active members in India, Mexico, Japan, China, Singapore, Thailand, Philippines, Malaya, Indo-China and Eastern and Southern Africa. During World War I, it was among the chief participants of the Hindu–German Conspiracy.

Berlin Committee 
The "Berlin committee for Indian independence" was established in 1915 by Virendra Nath Chattopadhya, including Bhupendra Nath Dutt & Lala Hardayal under "Zimmerman plan" with the full backing of German foreign office.

Their goal was mainly to achieve the following four objectives:

Mobilize Indian revolutionaries abroad.
Incite rebellion among Indian troops stationed. abroad.
Send volunteers and arms to India.
Even to Organized an armed invasion of British India to gain India's independence.

Chronology

Pre World War I

Alipore bomb conspiracy case and Action and Arms finding

Several leaders of the Jugantar party including Hare Krishna Konar were arrested for connection with Jugantar party in 1932 and depoted to Cellular Jail for 6 years and there he founded Communist Consolidation one of the revolutionary group of India Independence. Several others were also depoted to the Andaman Cellular Jail for doing Indian independence movement.

Howrah gang case
Most of the eminent Jugantar leaders including Bagha Jatin alias Jatindra Nath Mukherjee who were not arrested earlier, were arrested in 1910, in connection with the murder of Shamsul Alam. Thanks to Bagha Jatin's new policy of a decentralised federated action, most of the accused were released in 1911.

Delhi-Lahore conspiracy case

The Delhi Conspiracy case, also known as the Delhi–Lahore Conspiracy, hatched in 1912, planned to assassinate the then Viceroy of India, Lord Hardinge, on the occasion of transferring the capital of British India from Calcutta to New Delhi. Involving revolutionary underground in Bengal and headed by Rash Behari Bose along with Sachin Sanyal, the conspiracy culminated on the attempted assassination on 23 December 1912 when a home-made bomb was thrown into the Viceroys's Howdah when the ceremonial procession moved through the Chandni Chowk suburb of Delhi. The Viceroy escaped with his injuries, along with Lady Hardinge, although the Mahout was killed.

In the aftermath of the event, efforts were made to destroy the Bengali and Punjabi revolutionary underground, which came under intense pressure for sometime. Rash Behari successfully evaded capture for nearly three years, becoming actively involved in the Ghadar conspiracy before it was uncovered, and fleeing to Japan in 1916.

The investigations in the aftermath of the assassination attempt led to the Delhi Conspiracy Trial. Although Basanta Kumar Biswas was convicted of having thrown the bomb and executed, along with Amir Chand and Avadh Behari for their roles in the conspiracy, the true identity of the person who threw the bomb is not known to this day.

World War I

Indo-German Joint Movement

The Indo-German movement, also referred to as the Hindu–German Conspiracy or the Ghadar movement (or Ghadr conspiracy), was formulated during World War I between Indian Nationalists in India, the United States and Germany, the Irish Republicans, and the German Foreign office to initiate a Pan-Indian rebellion against The Raj with German support between 1914 and 1917, during World War I. The most famous amongst a number of plots planned to foment unrest and trigger a Pan-Indian mutiny in February 1915, in the British Indian Army from Punjab to Singapore, to overthrow The Raj in the Indian subcontinent. This conspiracy was ultimately thwarted at the last moment as British intelligence successfully infiltrated the Ghadarite movement and arrested key figures. The failed Singapore mutiny remains a famous part of this plot while mutinies in other smaller units and garrisons within India were also crushed.

World War I began with an unprecedented outpouring of loyalty and goodwill towards the United Kingdom from within the mainstream political leadership, contrary to initial British fears of an Indian revolt. India contributed massively to the British war effort by providing men and resources. About 1.3 million Indian soldiers and labourers served in Europe, Africa, and the Middle East, while both the Indian government and the princes sent large supplies of food, money, and ammunition. However, Bengal and Punjab remained hotbeds of anti-colonial activities. Terrorism in Bengal, increasingly closely linked with the unrest in Punjab, was significant enough to nearly paralyse the regional administration. With outlines of German links with the Indian revolutionary movement already in place as early as 1912, the main conspiracy was formulated between the Ghadar Party in the United States, the Berlin Committee in Germany, Indian revolutionary underground in India, Sinn Féin and the German Foreign Office through the consulate in San Francisco at the beginning of World War I. A number of failed attempts were made at mutiny, among them the February mutiny plan and the Singapore Mutiny. This movement was suppressed by means of a massive international counter-intelligence operation and draconian political acts (including the Defence of India Act 1915) that lasted nearly ten years. Other notable events that formed a part of the conspiracy include the Annie Larsen arms plot, the Mission to Kabul that also attempted to rally Afghanistan against British India. The Mutiny of the Connaught Rangers in India, as well as by some accounts, the Black Tom explosion in 1916 are also considered minor events linked to the conspiracy.

The Indo-Irish-German alliance and the conspiracy were the target of a worldwide intelligence effort by the British intelligence agencies which was ultimately successful in preventing further attempts and plans, and in the aftermath of the Annie Larsen affair, successfully directed the American intelligence agencies to arrest key figures at the time she entered World War I in 1917. The conspiracy led to the Lahore conspiracy case in India and the Hindu–German Conspiracy Trial in the USA, of which the latter at the time was one of the longest and most expensive trials in that country.
Largely subdued and suppressed by the end of the war, the movement posed a significant threat to British India during World War I and its aftermath, and was a major factor guiding The Raj's India policy.

Tehrek e Reshmi Rumal

During the war, the Pan-Islamist movement also attempted to overthrow the Raj, and came to form a close liaison with the Indo-German Conspiracy. Out of the Deobandi movement arose the Tehrek-e-Reshmi Rumal. The Deobandi leaders attempted to begin a pan-Islamic insurrection in British India during World War I by seeking support from Ottoman Turkey, Imperial Germany, Afghanistan. The plot was uncovered by Punjab CID with the capture of letters from Ubaidullah Sindhi, one of the Deobandi leaders then in Afghanistan, to Mahmud al Hasan another leader then in Persia. The letters were written in Silk cloth, hence the name of the Silk Letter Conspiracy.

Between the wars

Chittagong armoury raid

Surya Sen led Indian revolutionaries to raid the armoury of police and auxiliary forces and to cut all communication lines in Chittagong on 18 April 1930. After successfully completing the raid, revolutionaries establish Provincial National Government of India, after this in deadly clash with Government troops in Jalalabad Hill, revolutionaries scattered themselves in small groups. and Some revolutionaries were soon killed or arrested in a gun-fight with the police. Scores of Government officials, policeman were also killed. Pritilata Waddedar led the attack on European club in Chittagong in 1932. Surya Sen was arrested in 1933 and was hanged on 12 January 1934.

Central Assembly Bomb Case (1929)
Bhagat Singh and Batukeshwar Dutt threw a bomb in the assembly house along with leaflets stating their revolutionary philosophy – 'to make the deaf hear'. Bhagat Singh, Sukhdev and Rajguru were hanged and several others faced the verdict of imprisonment. Batukeshwar Dutt outlived all his comrades and died in July 1965 in Delhi. All of them cremated in Ferozpur (Punjab, India).

Baikuntha Shukla, the great nationalist was hanged for murdering Phanindrananth Ghosh who had become a government approver which led to the hanging of Bhagat Singh, Sukhdev and Rajguru. He was a nephew of Yogendra Shukla. Baikunth Shukla was also initiated into the independence struggle at a young age taking an active part in the 'Salt Satyagraha' of 1930. He was associated with revolutionary organisations like the Hindustan Seva Dal and the Hindustan Socialist Republican Association. The execution of the great Indian revolutionaries Bhagat Singh, Rajguru and Sukhdev in 1931 as a result of their trial in the 'Lahore conspiracy case' was an event that shook the entire country. Phanindra Nath Ghosh, hitherto a key member of the Revolutionary Party had treacherously betrayed the cause by turning an approver, giving evidence, which led to the execution. Baikunth was commissioned to plan the execution of Ghosh as an act of ideological vendetta which he carried out successfully on 9 November 1932. He was arrested and tried for the killing. Baikunth was convicted and hanged in Gaya Central Jail on 14 May 1934. He was only 28 years old.

On 27 February 1931, Chandrasekar Azad died in a shootout when cornered by the police.

It is unclear of the eventual fate of the Association, but the common understanding is that it disbanded with the death of Chandrashekar Azad and the hanging of its popular activists: Bhagat Singh, Sukhdev and Rajguru.

Dalhousie Square Bomb Case 
A bomb was thrown on the Calcutta Police Commissioner, Charles Tegart on 25 August 1930.

Kakori train robbery

Chandrasekhar Azad, Ramprasad Bismil, Jogesh Chatterjee, Ashfaqullah Khan, Banwari Lal and their accomplices participated in the robbery of treasury money that was being transported by train. The looting took place between Kakori station and Alamnagar, within  of Lucknow on 9 August 1925. Police started an intense man-hunt and arrested a large number of revolutionaries and tried them in the Kakori case. Ashfaqullah Khan, Ramprasad Bismil, Roshan Singh, Rajendra Lahiri were hanged, four others were sent to the Cellular Jail in Port Blair, Andaman for life and seventeen others were sentenced to long terms of imprisonment.

World War II and aftermath

The scenario changed with the years. The British were thinking to quit India and religious politics came into play. The basic political background of revolutionary ideas seemed to evolve in a new direction. The organised revolutionary movements can be said to have nearly ceased by 1936, apart from some stray sparks, like the killing of Sir Michael O'Dwyer, generally held responsible for the Amritsar Massacre, on 13 March 1940, by Udham Singh in London.

During the Quit India Movement of 1942, several other activities took place in different parts of India. However, those were discrete occurrences and hardly any large scale planned terrorism took place that could shake the British administration. Meanwhile, Subhas Chandra Bose was heading Indian National Army outside India and was working with Japanese Empire to move the army towards India. In 1945, Bose died in a plane crash after INA surrendered.

India was independent on 15 August 1947.

Many revolutionaries participated in mainstream politics and joined political parties like the Congress and, especially, the communist parties and took part in the parliamentary democracy that was India. On the other hand, many past revolutionaries, being released from captivity, led the lives of common men.

Notable revolutionaries

See also 
 Provisional Government of India

References

Sources

Further reading
 
 Ghosh, Durba. Gentlemanly Terrorists: Political Violence and the Colonial State in India, 1919-1947 (Cambridge University Press, 2017.)
 Maclean, Kama.  A Revolutionary History of Interwar India: Violence, Image, Voice and Text (Oxford University Press, 2015.)

External links 
 Revolutionaries in Cellular Jail, Andaman
 List of Revolutionaries in Cellular Jail, Andaman

 
Resistance to the British Empire